Dirk Cornelius Froneman (born 14 April 1954 in Winburg, Free State, South Africa) is a former South African rugby union player.

Playing career
Froneman made his provincial debut for the Free State in 1976 and was part of the Free State team that won the Currie Cup in 1976. 
Froneman played his only test match for the Springboks against the World XV on 27 August 1977 at Loftus Versfeld in Pretoria.

Test history

Accolades
Froneman was one of the five Young Players of the Year for 1976, along with Wouter Hugo, Divan Serfontein, Nick Mallet and LM Rossouw.

See also
List of South Africa national rugby union players – Springbok no. 492

References

1954 births
Living people
South African rugby union players
South Africa international rugby union players
Free State Cheetahs players
People from Masilonyana Local Municipality
Rugby union players from the Free State (province)
Rugby union centres